The Silver Condor Award for Best Actress , given by the Argentine Film Critics Association, awards the best actress in Argentina each year:

References

 
Argentine Film Critics Association